Cement is an extinct town in Bartow County, in the U.S. state of Georgia.

History
The community was named for a hydraulic cement plant which operated at the site. A post office called Cement was established in 1880, and remained in operation until 1910. The Georgia General Assembly incorporated the place as the "Town of Cement" in 1891.  The town's charter was officially repealed in 1995.

References

Geography of Bartow County, Georgia
Ghost towns in Georgia (U.S. state)